The Geraldton Cup is an unlisted Thoroughbred horse race taking place at the Geraldton Racecourse 435km north of Perth, Australia, which was first run on 8 December 1887 with a winner's purse of £300. The race, staged over 3,200 metres, was won by Baron Necktar, a full brother to Dunlop, the Melbourne Cup winner of the same year. In 1887, the Perth Cup had a winner's purse of £250 and placed Geraldton racing ahead of what was to become one of Western Australia's most popular races.

The Geraldton Gold Cup is hosted by the Geraldton Turf Club. The prize-money for the Geraldton Cup for 2015 was $90,000 and run over 2100m.

In 2007, Tapdog became the first horse to win the race three times.

Past winners

Notes

Sports competitions in Western Australia
Horse races in Australia
Geraldton